Freaks, Faggots, Drunks & Junkies is the fifth studio album by American punk rock musician GG Allin. A collaboration with backing band Bulge, the LP was first released by Homestead Records in 1988.

Critic Steve Huey said about the album: "Allin's entire output ranks as perhaps the worst music ever recorded; this is its clearest expression".

History 
Allin returned to his home area of New England sometime in late 1987 or early 1988, settling somewhere in New Hampshire only because, according to his self-penned liner notes for the album, "it's cheap". At the time, Allin had been prohibited from performing as a musician in Boston since around the time his first backing band, The Jabbers, were coming to the end of their run. Since the rushed recording and release of You Give Love a Bad Name the previous year, Allin had been in the recording studio only one other time, recording four songs with himself playing all of the instruments, aided by only two people who provided backing vocals.  These recordings almost immediately were released – without Allin's consent or immediate knowledge – under the false band name "GG Allin & His Illegitimate Kids".

Preferring to have a trustworthy live band helping him in the studio, Allin contacted Johnny X and Charlie Infection, co-founders of Boston independent punk label Ax/ction Records and the guitarist and drummer, respectively, of area punk/metal band Psycho. X and Infection had befriended and dealt with Allin in the past, most notably getting an unreleased GG & The Cedar Street Sluts track, "I Wanna Suck Your Cunt", contributed to a 7" compilation EP, Welcome To Ax/ction Island, as well as selling some Allin records and tapes through their mail order business. With Psycho's bassist Ed Lynch in tow, Allin and the band—using the name of their side project Bulge for the album—rehearsed and recorded 13 new songs for Allin's next album.  Another former member of Psycho, Bill Normal, also became involved with the album, pinch-hitting for Lynch on four of the tracks and playing some deliberately atonal synthesizer on the cut "Crash and Burn".

When the "Illegitimate Kids" tape suddenly came to light, Allin decided to "steal back" the recordings (which he owned to begin with) and append the four recordings to the album. For some unknown reason, however, Bulge, along with sometime Allin friend and collaborator Mark Sheehan (best known for working with Allin on The Suicide Sessions, The Troubled Troubadour, and the 1991 sessions that became bonus tracks on the CD version of You Give Love a Bad Name) would be credited with playing the instruments on the four tracks in question: "Wild Riding", "Family", "Young Little Meat", and "I Wanna Kill You".  Also for reasons unknown, Normal's contributions as bassist were not listed on the album, while his keyboard work on "Crash and Burn" was credited to him under the pseudonym "Dork".  It is possible that Allin forgot his name, as it was the only time the two met.

Allin was starting to get into poetry and spoken word performances – albeit in his own style – and decided to frame the opening and closing of the album with two pieces.

Track listing 
All songs written and arranged by GG Allin, Johnny X, Charlie Infection and Ed Lynch except where noted.

"My Revenge" – 0:43
"Dope Money" – 2:46
"Be My Fuckin' Whore" – 2:40
"Suck My Ass It Smells" – 0:27
"Dog Shit" – 2:12
"Wild Riding" (GG Allin) – 5:29
"Sleeping in My Piss" – 2:06
"Anti-Social Masturbator" – 3:12
"Last in Line for the Gang Bang" – 2:14
"Die When You Die" ("You're Gonna Die" by Destroy All Monsters, new lyrics by GG Allin) – 1:37
"Commit Suicide" – 1:53
"Crash & Burn" – 3:57
"Outlaw Scumfuc" ("Longhaired Redneck" by David Allan Coe, new lyrics by GG Allin) – 2:24
"Caroline and Sue" – 2:34
"Cunt Sucking Cannibal" (GG Allin, Scott Rag) – 2:44
"Family" (GG Allin) – 3:02
"Young Little Meat" (GG Allin) – 1:33
"I Wanna Kill You" (David Peel, new lyrics by GG Allin) – 3:18
"My Bloody Mutilation" – 5:03

Personnel 

On all tracks except 6, 16, 17 and 18:
GG Allin – vocals (credited as playing "microphone and whiskey")
Johnny X – guitar and backing vocals
Charlie Infection – drums and backing vocals
Ed Lynch – bass and backing vocals
Bill Normal (credited as "Dork") – keyboards on "Crash & Burn", uncredited bass on tracks 7, 9, 14 and 15

On tracks 6, 16, 17 and 18:
GG Allin – lead vocals and all instruments
Mark Sheehan, Erik Mercier, Greg Gonorea and Beth Burrow – backing vocals

References 

Homestead Records albums
Awareness Records albums
1988 albums
GG Allin albums